Rijeka Philological School was a 19th-century philological school that operated in Rijeka, offering a set of solutions for the issues involved in the standardization of Croatian literary language.

According to Kurelac, standard language should be based on elements shared by most of the Slavic languages. Modern literary language should be based on archaic forms, so archaicity became the main characteristic of the language of school's proponents. Among such features where:
 zero morpheme as the genitive plural ending (jelen, žen, sel)
 usage of dual in nouns and verbs (dvaju rukopisu, uvedosta me u kuću)
 first-person singular present form on -u (raduju se "I rejoice", as opposed to radujem se)
 usage of the demonstrative pronoun s, si, se "this, that" (se jeseni "this autumn")
 usage of infinitives without the final -i (pokazat)
 usage of archaic Croatian words, Church Slavonicisms and words from other Slavic languages (božjački "poorly, miserably", naočnjaci "glasses", paklina "resin", horugva "flag", batog "stick, club", rabota "work" etc.)

Kurelac's enthusiasm for archaic forms provided a basis for his purist views. He was opposed to loanwords and calques from German, Italian and Ottoman Turkish, but a bit more tolerant towards the loanwords from Slavic languages. Because most of his followers were gymnasium students with no trained future philologist among them, Rijeka Philological School soon ceased being a relevant competitor to Zagreb Philological School.


See also
 Zagreb Philological School
 Zadar Philological School

Notes

References

Further reading
 

Croatian language
19th century in Croatia